Harpalini is a tribe of a diverse group of ground beetles belonging to the subfamily Harpalinae within the broader family Carabidae. The tribe contains more than 1,900 species.

Genera
These 103 genera belong to Harpalini:

 Subtribe Amblystomina Fauvel, 1889
 Amblystomus Erichson, 1837
 Anomostomus LaFerté-Sénectère, 1853
 Barysomus Dejean, 1829
 Oosoma Nietner, 1857
 Subtribe Ditomina Bonelli, 1810
 Bronislavia Semenov, 1891
 Carenochyrus Solsky, 1874
 Carterus Dejean, 1830
 Chilotomus Chaudoir, 1842
 Ditomus Bonelli, 1810
 Dixus Billberg, 1820
 Eocarterus Stichel, 1923
 Eucarterus Reitter, 1900
 Graniger Motschulsky, 1864
 Indocarterus Kataev & Wrase, 2018
 Liochirus Tschitscherine, 1897
 Machozetus Chaudoir, 1850
 Odotoncarus Solier, 1835
 Oedesis Motschulsky, 1850
 Pachycarus Solier, 1835
 Parapenthes Kataev & Wrase, 2018
 Penthus Chaudoir, 1843
 Phorticosomus Schaum, 1863
 Proditomus Schauberger, 1934
 Pseudaristus Reitter, 1900
 Tschitscherinellus Csiki, 1906
 Subtribe Harpalina Bonelli, 1810
 Acinopus Dejean, 1821
 Afromizonus Basilewsky, 1947
 Allosiopelus N.Ito, 1995
 Amblygnathus Dejean, 1829
 Anisocnemus Chaudoir, 1843
 Athrostictus Bates, 1878
 Axinotoma Dejean, 1829
 Aztecarpalus Ball, 1970
 Bleusea Bedel, 1897
 Boeomimetes Péringuey, 1896
 Bradybaenus Dejean, 1829
 Coleolissus Bates, 1892
 Cratacanthus Dejean, 1829
 Cratognathus Dejean, 1829
 Daptus Fischer von Waldheim, 1823
 Dioryche W.S.MacLeay, 1825
 Discoderus LeConte, 1853
 Dregus Motschulsky, 1864
 Ectinothorax Alluaud, 1941
 Eriophonus Tschitscherine, 1901
 Euryderus LeConte, 1846
 Geodromus Dejean, 1829
 Harpalinus Jeannel, 1946
 Harpaliscus Bates, 1892
 Harpalobrachys Tschitscherine, 1899
 Harpalodiodes Bousquet, 2002
 Harpalomimus Facchini & Giachino, 2020
 Harpalomorphus Péringuey, 1896
 Harpalus Latreille, 1802
 Harpathaumas Basilewsky, 1947
 Harponixus Basilewsky, 1950
 Hartonymus Casey, 1914
 Heteracantha Brullé, 1835
 Hyphaereon W.S.MacLeay, 1825
 Indiophonus N.Ito, 1996
 Kareya Andrewes, 1919
 Lampetes Andrewes, 1940
 Laparhetes Jeannel, 1946
 Liodaptus Bates, 1889
 Meroctenus Gemminger & Harold, 1868
 Microderes Faldermann, 1836
 Neoaulacoryssus Noonan, 1985
 Neodiachipteryx Noonan, 1985
 Neohyparpalus Clarke, 1981
 Neophygas Noonan, 1976
 Nesacinopus Tschitscherine, 1900
 Nesarpalus Bedel, 1897
 Nipponoharpalus Habu, 1973
 Nothodaptus Maindron, 1906
 Oesyperus Andrewes, 1923
 Omostropus Péringuey, 1896
 Ooidius Chaudoir, 1847
 Ophoniscus Bates, 1892
 Ophonus Dejean, 1821
 Oxycentrus Chaudoir, 1854
 Panagrius Andrewes, 1933
 Pangus Dejean, 1821
 Parasiopelus Basilewsky, 1946
 Paraulacoryssus Shpeley; Hunting & Ball, 2017
 Parophonus Ganglbauer, 1891
 Paulianoscirtus Basilewsky, 1976
 Penthophonus Reitter, 1900
 Piosoma LeConte, 1847
 Platymetopsis Ball & Maddison, 1987
 Platymetopus Dejean, 1829
 Prakasha Andrewes, 1919
 Pseudodiachipteryx Burgeon, 1936
 Pseudohyparpalus Basilewsky, 1946
 Pseudoselenophorus Péringuey, 1896
 Selenophorus Dejean, 1829
 Selenotichnus Kataev, 1999
 Siopelophonus Kataev, 2015
 Siopelus Murray, 1859
 Stenomorphus Dejean, 1831
 Trichopselaphus Chaudoir, 1843
 Trichotichnus A.Morawitz, 1863
 Trichoxycentrus N.Ito, 2000
 Typsiharpalus Tschitscherine, 1901

References

Carabidae
Beetle tribes